Nikolo-Kazanka (Nikolo-Qaźan) is a rural locality (a village) in Uryush-Bittulinsky Selsoviet, Karaidelsky District, Bashkortostan, Russia. The population was 12 as of 2010. There is 1 street.

Geography 
Nikolo-Kazanka is located 39 km southwest of Karaidel (the district's administrative centre) by road. Atnyashkino is the nearest rural locality.

References 

Rural localities in Karaidelsky District